The Black Orchid may refer to:

 The Black Orchid (1916 film), a 1916 film starring Grace Darmond
 The Black Orchid (film), a 1958 film starring Sophia Loren and Anthony Quinn
 The Black Orchid (nightclub), a former Chicago nightclub

See also
 Black orchid (disambiguation)